Muhammad Nsereko is an Independent member of the Ugandan parliament, who has represented the Kampala Central Division constituency since 2011.

Background and education
He was born on 25 August 1981. He attended "Buganda Road Primary School" for his elementary education, graduating in 1995. He then transferred to Kibuli Secondary School, for his middle school education, graduating in 1999. For his high school education, he studied at "Kawempe Muslim Secondary School", graduating in 2002.

In 2005, he graduated with a Diploma in Journalism, from the "International Institute of Business and Management Studies" (IIBMS). The following year, he graduated from Makerere University, with a Bachelor of Laws. In 2007, he was awarded the Diploma in Legal Practice, by the Law Development Centre.

Work experience
Nsereko is a professional and registered lawyer and a member of the Uganda Bar. He has worked as a partner in the law firm of "Nsereko, Mukalazi and Company Advocates", since 2007. He also served as the chairman of the Kampala Central Land Committee, from 2006 until 2010.

Political career
In 2011, Nsereko contested the Kampala Central Division constituency on the ruling National Resistance Movement (NRM) political party ticket. He won. During the 9th parliament (2011 to 2016), he became a vocal critic of the way the NRM was governing the country. He outlined several areas 
of disagreement with his political party, including (a) the proposed conversion of Mabira Forest Reserve into sugar plantations (b) the proposed scrapping of bail for some crimes (c) he abhors the rampant corruption of the ruling class (d) he deplores the high unemployment rates among the country's youth and (e) he supports the restoration of presidential term-limits which was scrapped in 2005.

His open defiance of the NRM party, led to his expulsion from the NRM party, in April 2013, together with three other NRM members of parliament. The four became known as the "Rebel MPs". In September 2013 the Constitutional Court ruled 4–1, that the four MPs should step out of parliament until the same court deliberated on whether they should stay. Three days later, on 10 September 2013, the Supreme Court ruled 6–1 that the MPs should stay in parliament until the Constitutional Court completed its deliberations on whether they should stay. Finally on 12 February 2014, the Constitutional Court ruled that the four MPs should vacate parliament. That decision was overturned by the Supreme Court on 30 October 2015, and Nsereko and his colleagues returned to parliament as independents.

Muhammad Nsereko was re-elected to the 10th parliament (2016 to 2021), as an independent and he continues to be a leader against the ongoing amendment to change the constitution and remove the presidential age limit.

See also
Cabinet of Uganda
List of members of the tenth Parliament of Uganda
List of political parties in Uganda

References

External links
Website of the Parliament of Uganda

Living people
1981 births
21st-century Ugandan lawyers
Ganda people
People from Kampala
Kampala Central Division
People from Central Region, Uganda
Makerere University alumni
Law Development Centre alumni
Independent politicians in Uganda
Members of the Parliament of Uganda
National Resistance Movement politicians
21st-century Ugandan politicians